Lucapa is a town, with a population of 110,000 (2014 census) and a municipality with a population of 154,305 (2014 census), located in eastern Angola. Lucapa is the former capital of Lunda Norte Province.

Until the 2014 census its population was difficult to estimate as it has changed greatly over the last 15 years due to internal displacement caused by civil war and the subsequent resettlement.

The primary industry in the town is mining and several thousand residents are employed by the co-operative mining group formed by SML and ITM Mining. There is also a third company that has a small share in the mining operation. The third company consists primarily of retired and current senior military officers, indicating the influence that they still have within the Angolan government, and the extent to which the government has to go to ensure stability within the armed forces.

References 

Populated places in Lunda Norte Province
Municipalities of Angola
Provincial capitals in Angola